HistoryLink is an online encyclopedia of Washington state history. The site has more than 8,100 entries and attracts 5,000 daily visitors. It has 500 biographies and more than 14,000 images.

The non-profit historical organization History Ink produces HistoryLink.org, stating that it is the nation's first online encyclopedia of local and state history created expressly for the Internet. Walt Crowley was the founding president and executive director.

History
In 1997, Crowley discussed preparing a Seattle-King County historical encyclopedia for the 2001 sesquicentennial of the Denny Party. His wife Marie McCaffrey suggested publishing the encyclopedia on the Internet.

They and Paul Dorpat incorporated History Ink on November 10, 1997, with seed money from Priscilla "Patsy" Collins, by birth a member of Seattle's wealthy and prominent Bullitt family. The prototype of HistoryLink.org debuted on May 1, 1998, and attracted additional funding for a formal launch in 1999. The website was noted for its coverage of the 1999 WTO protests in Downtown Seattle, maintaining a live webcam feed pointed at the intersection of 4th Avenue and Pike Street. In 2003 HistoryLink.org expanded its content to cover Washington state history, including new essays and features. Meanwhile, History Ink continues, focusing on the production of history books.

A 2008 grant from the Henry M. Jackson Foundation funded several freelance writers to expand coverage of Snohomish County. The Snohomish County Historic Preservation Commission has funded yearly grants for the same purpose.

Content

HistoryLink primarily features articles that are similar to a traditional encyclopedia entry, as well as timeline entries and first-person accounts called "People's Histories".

Awards
Crowley and HistoryLink.org have won many awards, including
 The Pacific Northwest Historians Guild's 2007 History Award
 The Washington State Historic Preservation Office's award for media in 2001
 The Association of King County Historical Organizations award for best long-term project (2000)

References

External links

History Link video

American online encyclopedias
History of Washington (state)
Internet properties established in 1998
Creative Commons-licensed websites